British Crane Hire Corporation Ltd v Ipswich Plant Hire Ltd [1973] EWCA Civ 6 is an English contract law case concerning the issue of incorporation of terms with regular business dealings.

Facts
British Crane Hire Corporation Ltd and Ipswich Plant Hire Ltd carried on plant hire businesses. They had contracted with one another previously in February and October 1969, when a printed form was used. In June 1970, Ipswich Plant needed a crane urgently. Ipswich Plant’s manager had been unaware of previous dealings, but hire and transport charges were agreed by phone, and British Crane delivered. A form followed. This provided the hirers would pay for recovery expenses. Ipswich Plant did not sign it on this occasion. The crane sank into marshland and got stuck in the mud. British Crane recovered the crane with considerable cost. British Crane argued that the unsigned form was incorporated into the oral contract, given their previous dealings.

At first instance the judge held the term putting the cost of recovery on the hirer was not incorporated. British Crane appealed.

Judgment
Lord Denning MR's ruling is known for its typically laconic opening sentence:

Denning held the clause was incorporated, so Ipswich Plant had to reimburse for the recovery expenses.

Megaw LJ and Sir Eric Sachs concurred.

See also

English contract law

Notes

English contract case law
Court of Appeal (England and Wales) cases
1973 in British law
1973 in case law
Vehicle rental